The 2019–20 season of the Ukrainian Championship Higher League is the 29th season of Ukraine's top women's football league. It runs from 20 July 2019 to 30 May 2020.

Due to the ongoing COVID-19 pandemic across the globe, the spring portion of the competition was suspended. Finally in early July 2020, the UAF Executive Committee approved continuation of the Women's Top Division as per the existing season's regulations and pre-cautionary health security measures that were adopted in Ukraine in late May 2020.

Teams

Team changes

Name changes
 EMS Podillia Vinnytsia last season was known as Vinnytsia Oblast DYuSSh
 Spartak-Orion Mykolaiv last season was known as Orion-Avto Mykolaiv
 Inviktus Kyiv that last season was known as SC Vyshneve changed its name to Kolos Kovalivka 
 Prykarpattia-DYuSSh-3 last season was known as Stanislavchanka-DYuSSh-3
 Ateks Kyiv last season was known as Ateks-SDYuShOR-16

Stadiums

Managers

League table

Results

Top scorers

Persha Liha

Group A

Group B

References

External links
WFPL.ua
Women's Football.ua

2019-20
2019–20 in Ukrainian association football leagues
Ukraine, women